Darah District or formerly known as Darah Hazara (دره هزاره) is a District of Panjshir Province in Afghanistan. The inhabitants are predominantly Sunni Hazaras. The population in 2019 was estimated to be 15,407.

See also 
 Districts of Afghanistan
 Panjshir Province

References 

Districts of Panjshir Province